Yaya Cissokho (born 24 January 1957 isformer Senegalese basketball player. Cissokho competed for Senegal at the 1980 Summer Olympics, where he scored 5 points in 6 games.

References

Living people
Senegalese men's basketball players
Olympic basketball players of Senegal
Basketball players at the 1980 Summer Olympics
1955 births